Baldwin van Lannoy, Lord of Molembais, nicknamed "Le Bègue" (The Stutterer; 1388 in Hénin-Beaumont – 1474 in Huppaye) was a Flemish statesman, and ambassador for Philip the Good at the court of Henry V of England.

Family 
He was a member of the noble de Lannoy family. He was a son of Guilbert I of Lannoy and Catherine de Saint-Aubin, Lady of Molembais. He is the founder of the Branch of the Lords of Molenbais. He married twice; first to Marie, Lady of Melles and 2nd to Adrienne de Berlaymont, who gave him 4 children:

 Baldwin de Lannoy, Lord of Molembais: Knight Of the Golden Fleece;married to Marie d'Esne, Lady of Conroy.
Jacqueline de Lannoy; married to Claude Bouton, Lord of Corbaron
 Philippote de Lannoy; married to Jean de Jauche, lord of Mastaing
 Anne de Lannoy; married to Leon, lord of Proisy
 Hugues de Lannoy; canon in Liege, Cathedral.

Career 
During his career he was named Governor of Lille. When Baldwin became Knight in the Order of the Golden Fleece, he commissioned a portrait to be painted by Jan van Eyck.

References 

 Genealogie online (in Dutch)

1388 births
1474 deaths
15th-century diplomats
Lannoy
Burgundian knights
Nobility of the Burgundian Netherlands
Baldwin